A football team is a group of players selected to play together in the various team sports known as football. Such teams could be selected to play in a match against an opposing team, to represent a football club, group, state or nation, an all-star team or even selected as a hypothetical team (such as a Dream Team or Team of the Century) and never play an actual match.

The difference between a football team and a football club is incorporation, a football club is an entity which is formed and governed by a committee and has members which may consist of supporters in addition to players. The benefit of club formation is that it gives teams access to additional volunteer or paid support staff, facilities and equipment. 

One team, the Washington Football Team of the NFL, named themselves after the phrase (and also because they are a football team) for two seasons, but are now known as the Commanders.

Summary
There are several varieties of football, including association football, gridiron football, Australian rules football, Gaelic football, rugby league and rugby union. The number of players selected for each team, within these varieties and their associated codes, can vary substantially. Sometimes, the word "team" is limited to those who play on the field in a match and does not always include other players who may take part as replacements or emergency players. "Football squad" may be used to be inclusive of these support and reserve players.

The words team and club are sometimes used interchangeably by supporters, typically referring to the team within the club playing in the highest division or competition. A football club is a type of sports club which is an organized or incorporated body. Typically these will have a committee, secretary, president or chairperson, registrar and members. Football clubs typically have a set of rules, including rules under which they play and are themselves typically members of a league or association which are affiliated with a governing body within their sport. Clubs may field multiple teams from their registered players (which may participate in several different divisions or leagues). A club is responsible for ensuring the continued existence of its teams in their respective competitions. The oldest football clubs date back to the early 19th century. While records exist for most incorporated clubs, they do not exist for all football clubs. Standalone clubs are usually run like businesses and appear on official registers. However many football clubs were formed as part of larger organisations (schools, athletic clubs, societies) and therefore public records of their formation and operation may not be kept unless they compete with other teams. Football clubs may also be dormant for periods and be re-formed (for example going into recess for reasons such as war or lack of a league or competition to participate in) and even switch between football codes. Likewise, a football club may fold if it becomes insolvent or is incapable of fielding a team to play matches.

Variation of player numbers among football codes

The number of players that take part in the sport simultaneously, thus forming the team are:

Association football: 11
Seven-a-side football:7
Indoor soccer: 5-7
Futsal, beach football, five-a-side football: 5
American football: 11
Arena football: 8
Canadian football: 12
Rugby league: 13
Rugby union: 15
Rugby sevens: 7
Gaelic football: 15
Australian rules football: 18

Lists of association football teams
Lists of association football clubs
List of men's national association football teams
List of women's association football clubs
List of women's national association football teams

Lists of Australian rules football teams
List of Australian rules football clubs

See also
Football club (association football)
Football club (East Germany)

References
 

Football teams